Gerry Horkan is an Irish Fianna Fáil politician who has served as a Senator for the Industrial and Commercial Panel since April 2021, and previously from April 2016 to March 2020.

He was a member of Dún Laoghaire–Rathdown County Council from 2003 to 2016. He was the Fianna Fáil Seanad spokesperson on Finance. He lost his seat at the 2020 Seanad election, only to regain it a year later at the 2021 Seanad by-elections.

References

External links
Gerry Horkan's page on the Fianna Fáil website

Living people
Year of birth missing (living people)
Date of birth missing (living people)
Fianna Fáil senators
Politicians from Dublin (city)
Members of the 25th Seanad
Members of the 26th Seanad
Local councillors in Dún Laoghaire–Rathdown
Alumni of University College Dublin